Long George Devenish (11 May 1871 – 1 February 1943) was a South African international rugby union player who played as a halfback.

He made 1 appearance for South Africa against the British Lions in 1896.

References

South African rugby union players
South Africa international rugby union players
1871 births
1943 deaths
Rugby union halfbacks